Deluxe Music is a German free-to-air music television channel, operated by Just Music Fernsehbetriebs and owned by High View Holding. The channel was founded in 2004 by the German media entrepreneurs Markus Langemann and Cosmin Ene and started broadcasting on 1 April 2005. The target audience is 25-year-olds and older.

The channel specializes in a varied range of music styles. In the daytime it plays more popular music, and broadcasts more specific styles at night, such as disco or rock.

The channel is broadcast on the Astra 19.2 satellite, as well as on cable systems. A HD version was launched in December 2012, as part of the HD+ package.

In January 2012, Deluxe Television filed for insolvency. In March 2012, it was bought by the High View group.

In January 2023, High View announced an agreement with Astra satellite operator, SES, to lease additional capacity for four new music channels, Deluxe Dance by Kontor, Deluxe Flashback, Deluxe Rock and Deluxe Rap. The new channels will start on 1 February 2023 and broadcast free-to-air.

Audience share

Germany

References

External links
 

Television stations in Germany
Mass media in Munich
German-language television networks
Television channels and stations established in 2005
2005 establishments in Germany
Television channels in North Macedonia